The Irish Amateur Championship (occasionally known as the Irish National Championship) is an annual snooker competition played in Ireland and is the highest ranking amateur event in Ireland.

History
The competition was first established back in 1927 which was won by T.H. Fayrey. The title is currently held by Brendan O'Donoghue, who has won the competition a record five times in the modern era.

Many former champions have gone on to play on the world tour such as Colm Gilcreest, David Morris, Vincent Muldoon, Brendan O'Donoghue, Rodney Goggins and, most notably, twice winner Ken Doherty. He went on to become the only former  Irish champion to win the World Snooker Championship in 1997, when he ended Stephen Hendry's run of five consecutive wins.

Winners

References

Snooker amateur competitions
Recurring sporting events established in 1927
Snooker competitions in Ireland
1927 establishments in Ireland